Callizygaena albipuncta is a moth in the Zygaenidae family. It was described by George Hampson in 1900 from Sri Lanka.

References

Moths described in 1900